Hiram Torres Rigual (July 16, 1922 – December 3, 2006) was born in Mayagüez, Puerto Rico.  After serving as an Internal Revenue agent as well as an aide to Puerto Rico's Treasury Secretary, he studied law at the University of Puerto Rico while he worked summers as a professor of Political Science on the same campus.  He clerked with Supreme Court of Puerto Rico Associate Justice Borinquen Marrero upon his law school graduation in 1949 and held other government posts including over 15 years as an aide to Governors Luis Muñoz Marín and Roberto Sánchez Vilella and obtained a Masters in Public Law at Harvard Law School.

Sánchez Vilella appointed him a Superior Court judge in 1965, elevating him to the Supreme Court in 1968, where he served as an Associate Justice from May 17, 1968 until January 31, 1985, when he retired at the age of 62.

He died on December 3, 2006 at age 84 in Miami, Florida, and was honored with a state funeral at the Supreme Court attended by Governor Aníbal Acevedo Vilá, Senate President Kenneth McClintock, House Speaker José Aponte Hernández as well as the six members of the Supreme Court.

Sources 

La Justicia en sus Manos by Luis Rafael Rivera, 

1922 births
2006 deaths
Associate Justices of the Supreme Court of Puerto Rico
Harvard Law School alumni
University of Puerto Rico alumni
People from Mayagüez, Puerto Rico
20th-century Puerto Rican lawyers
20th-century American judges